The Christophorus-Kantorei Altensteig is the concert choir of the Christophorus Music Gymnasium Altensteig (Germany). It is composed of girls and boys between the ages of 15 and 19 years. The Choir is conducted by Michael Nonnenmann since 1993 and was founded in 1962 by KMD Dr. Jürg Wieber. Every member of choir takes voice lessons from voice trainers Eberhard Schuler-Meybier and Jeanette Bühler.

Repertoire 
The choir has an extensive repertoire of sacred and secular a cappella music with focus on contemporary works like "Short People" by Randy Newman, but also pieces and oratorios by Bach, Handel, Mendelssohn, Schumann, Gounod and Bruch.

Concerts 
The Christophorus-Kantorei Altensteig gives 30 to 40 concerts a year in Germany and on an annually concert tour that led to New Zealand, Norway, Denmark, Greece, the Czech Republic, Romania, Hungary, the US, Belgium and France in the past few years.

Awards 
1997, 2001, 2005, 2009: 1st Prize at Landeschorwettbewerb Baden-Württemberg
2000: 1st Prize cum laude at European Music Festival for the Youth in Neerpelt/ Belgium
2002, 2006: 3rd Prize at "German Choir Competition" in Osnabrück/ Kiel
2005: 1st Prize at Festival Internacional de Música de Cantonigròs in Spain
2008: 3rd at International Musical Eisteddfod in Llangollen/ Wales
2009: 2nd Prize and Award of the Audience at International Chamber Choir Competition Marktoberdorf
2010: 1st Prize at "German Choir Competition" in Dortmund

Discography (selection)
The choir produced more than 20 CDs, the most recent publications are:
1996 - Internationale Chormusik
1998 - Jauchzet dem Herren
2001 - Jesus Christ Superstar
2002 - Cantate Domino
2007 - Geistliche und weltliche Chormusik
2012 - O du Fröhliche
2012 - Laudate omnes gentes
2012 - Insalata Vocale

References

External links 
 Website of Christophorus-Kantorei Altensteig (English)

German choirs